Julio Gonzalvo Falcón (11 April 1917, Gelsa, Zaragoza - 20 July 2003), also referred to as Julio Gonzalvo or Gonzalvo I, is a former Spanish footballer. His two younger brothers were also notable footballers. Josep Gonzalvo, known as Gonzalvo II, and Marià Gonzalvo, known as Gonzalvo III, both played for FC Barcelona and Spain.

Gonzalvo made his La Liga debut with RCD Espanyol on 3 December 1939 in a 1-0 win over FC Barcelona. While at Espanyol he helped them win a Campionat de Catalunya/Copa del Generalísimo double in 1940. In 1941 he joined Real Zaragoza and together with his brother Marià, helped them gain promotion to La Liga in 1942. After two seasons at Real, he joined CE Sabadell FC and during the 1943-44 season he played in the same team as his other brother Josep. He joined his two brothers at FC Barcelona in 1945 but fell out with the coach, Josep Samitier and never played for their first team.

Honours
RCD Espanyol

Copa del Generalísimo
 1940: 1
Campionat de Catalunya : 1
1939-40: 1

Real Zaragoza

Segunda División:
Runners-up: 1942: 1

References

1917 births
2003 deaths
Footballers from Catalonia
Spanish footballers
La Liga players
RCD Espanyol footballers
FC Barcelona players
CE Sabadell FC footballers
Real Zaragoza players
Association football midfielders
People from Vallès Occidental
Sportspeople from the Province of Barcelona
Footballers from Aragon
Juli